Ophélie Fontana (born 15 July 1979) is a Belgian television news presenter for RTBF.

References

Living people
1979 births
Belgian journalists